Forest Hills Public Schools (FHPS) is a school district serving portions of the townships of Ada Township, Cascade Township, and Grand Rapids Township and portions of the cities of Grand Rapids and Kentwood in Kent County in the U.S. state of Michigan. This area is roughly approximated for statistical purposes by the census-designated place Forest Hills.

The Forest Hills School District, located in suburban Grand Rapids, was founded in 1956 when residents in 13 neighboring, one-room schools consolidated into one district to build a high school for their children. The district has grown to serve over 9,800 students and annually gains 200-300 new students.

District schools
Elementary Schools
Pre-Kindergarten to 4th grade
Ada Elementary School 
Ada Vista Elementary School 
Collins Elementary School 
Meadow Brook Elementary School 
Pine Ridge Elementary School
Thornapple Elementary School
5th/6th Grade Schools
Central Woodlands 5/6 School 
Northern Trails 5/6 School 
Goodwillie Environmental School
Pre-Kindergarten to 6th grade
Knapp Forest Elementary School
Orchard View Elementary School

Middle Schools (7th - 8th grade)
Central Middle School
Eastern Middle School
Northern Hills Middle School

High Schools (9th - 12th grade)
Forest Hills Central High School
Forest Hills Northern High School
Forest Hills Eastern High School

The District also maintains an administrative office, an aquatic center, and a fine arts center.

Awards 

Grand Rapids Magazine ranks Forest Hills Public Schools #1.
In 2003, Forest Hills Central High School was named one of the best high schools in the nation according to Newsweek, ranking #726 out of the top 1,000.  Forest Hills Northern High School was also ranked, at #937.  There are over 27,000 high schools in the United States, putting both Central High School and Northern High School among the top 4%.

Community Programs
FHPS has a division, Forest Hills Community Services, which plans and coordinates youth enrichment and sports programs, aquatic programs, adult enrichment classes, and senior citizens programs. Programs are offered each quarter with a Summer Academy for preschool to high school students.

Notable alumni

Jared Veldheer, offensive tackle, Arizona Cardinals. 
Dick DeVos, former CEO of Amway and former Michigan gubernatorial candidate
Kim Zimmer, actress
Kyle Visser (2003), former NCAA college basketball scholarship athlete (Wake Forest University)
Gretchen Whitmer, 49th Governor of Michigan

External links
Forest Hills Public School District website
Forest Hills Public Schools Fine Arts Center
Forest Hills Public Schools Community Services

References

School districts in Michigan
School districts established in 1956
Education in Kent County, Michigan
1956 establishments in Michigan